Bonny Bee Hom is Child ballad 92.

Synopsis

A lady laments that her love had left her. He, still there, comes to comfort her but tells her that he is sworn to leave. She gives him a ring:  while he wears it, he will shed no blood, but if he sees the stone fade, he will know she is dead. He is departed for "twelve month and a day" before the stone fades. He gives all his goods as alms to his hometown, and dies, uniting with the lady's soul in heaven.

Motifs
The magic ring is found also in the ballad "Hind Horn".

References

Child Ballads
Year of song unknown
Songwriter unknown